In The Beginning is a compilation by death metal band Nile, released in 2000 through Relapse Records. The compilation combines their two EPs Festivals of Atonement and Ramses Bringer of War in their entirety, previously released on February 10, 1995, and November 19, 1996, respectively. Both EPs were released on the band's own label Anubis Records.

Track listing

Personnel
Festivals of Atonement
 Karl Sanders - vocals, guitars
 Chief Spires - bass, vocals
 Pete Hammoura - drums, percussion

Ramses Bringer of War
 Karl Sanders - vocals, guitars
 Chief Spires - bass, vocals
 Pete Hammoura - drums, vocals
 John Ehlers - guitars

Production and design
 Jimmy Ennis - production, engineering
 Earl Sanders - co-production
 Nile - production
 Steve Hoier - cover art
 Andy Tapeworm - artwork (additional)
 Pete Tsakiris - design

References

Nile (band) albums
2000 compilation albums
Relapse Records albums
Hammerheart Records albums